Nelson Papucci III (born March 1, 1968) is an American hypnotist, author, educator, and retired politician. He was a Republican member of the Alabama House of Representatives from Madison County between 1994 and 1998.

After retiring from politics, Papucci authored The San Diego Padres, 1969-2002: A Complete History, which chronicled the early years of the franchise.

Currently, Papucci is a professional hypnotist, performing comedy stage performances throughout the country. He also teaches mathematics and holds a real estate broker license.

References 

1968 births
Living people
Sportswriters from Alabama
American hypnotists
Republican Party members of the Alabama House of Representatives
21st-century American male writers
Baseball writers
People from Madison County, Alabama
20th-century American politicians